David Florimbi (born 9 May 1961) is an American-born artist living in Santa Barbara, California. Florimbi spent his formative years in Spain and Italy. He attended Georgetown University where he studied Fine Art, there he was awarded the Milton Glaser Design Fellowship by the Milton Glaser Foundation.  Upon graduation in 1983, Florimbi was awarded a scholarship by the University of Georgia to study painting in Cortona, Italy.  Since 1984 his work has been exhibited nationally and internationally in Italy (Palazzo di Cortona and the American Academy of Rome), New York (K&E, Radix, and the Ronald Feldman Gallery) and numerous shows throughout California.  His work has also been included in museum shows, most recently at the Santa Barbara Museum of Contemporary Art, the University Art Museum at UCSB, and the Georgetown University Gallery in Washington D.C.

Florimbi and his work have been widely reviewed and featured in publications ranging from Vanity Fair to Architectural Digest. and reviewed by prominent art critic Donald Kuspit who said of his work:
“Sex, power, and spirituality seem to be Florimbi's basic themes. He gives them modern form and fresh impact even as he filters them through traditional art....it seems a tour-de-force of painterly handling and emotional expression.”

More recently, The Huffington Post wrote of his 2012 exhibition, ‘Going and Coming’:

"Florimbi incorporates Michelangelo’s illogical axis-spinning furiously against all odds--with Rene Magritte’s invitation to catch shapes in the clouds. Giorgione’s storm warnings mingle with O’Keeffe’s gaping spaces all beneath Titian’s exquisite sculpted clouds. Each Painting emits a supernatural weather so strong it threatens to suck us in, uncertain as to whether we will sink, soar, float or fall.”

Prominent collections of Florimbi’s work include the Cedars-Sinai Medical Center, the UCLA Medical Center, and the Frederick Weisman Foundation, among others.

Notes

American artists
1961 births
Living people